Subkulture is a music magazine and online community dedicated to gothic music and culture.

History
The website was originally an events management and promotion label during the mid-1990s. Fliers promoting events produced by Subkulture note that they are benefit events.

Subkulture was also a distributor of American Industrialnation magazine in the Philippines. Subkulture helped advance the career of young bands in the Philippines, including Sea of Rains.

Subkulture online magazine was launched at the end of 2011.

The Eastern Goth Valley

Subkulture's Eternal Death Wake (EDW) Music Festival, known as The Eastern Goth Valley, is an annual Halloween music gathering held every October in the Philippines. It was the first goth festival in the Philippines, and has been featured in Japan's counterculture magazine Burst as well as various TV programs.

The EDW event has hosted foreign artists such as the Angina Pectoris (Germany), Eve of Destiny (Japan), Kozi (Japan), Roughhausen (Canada and Taiwan ), DJ Eiji (Japan), Haruhiko Ash (Japan), DJ Nekrokael (France), and Psydoll (Japan).

See also
List of electronic music festivals
List of gothic festivals

References

External links
 Official site

Online music magazines
Internet properties established in 1994
Goth subculture